École Aux quatre vents is a Francophone high school in Dalhousie, New Brunswick, Canada. It serves around 200 students from grade nine through twelve of Dalhousie, Eel River Dundee, Balmoral region to the Belledune/Jacquet River Border.

External links
 Aux quatre vents School Site

High schools in New Brunswick
Education in Restigouche County, New Brunswick